Irwin Paul Rothenberg (December 31, 1921 – July 18, 2009) was an American professional basketball player. He played for the Cleveland Rebels, Washington Capitols, Baltimore Bullets, St. Louis Bombers, and New York Knicks of the Basketball Association of America (now known as the National Basketball Association). Rothenberg also played in the American Basketball League for the Philadelphia Sphas, New York Gothams, and Paterson Crescents.

College career
Irv played college basketball at Long Island University where his team qualified for the 1942 NIT.

Professional career

American Basketball League career
For the 1944-45 season, Irv played for the Philadelphia Sphas where they won the league title.

For the 1945-46 season, Irv played for the New York Gothams.

For the 1949–50 and 1950-51 seasons, Irv played for the Paterson Crescents.

Basketball Association of America career
For the 1946–47 BAA season, Irv played for the Cleveland Rebels.

For the 1947–48 BAA season, Irv played for the Washington Capitols, Baltimore Bullets, and St. Louis Bombers.  That season, he led the BAA in games played 

For the 1948–49 BAA season, Irv played for the New York Knicks.

BAA career statistics

Regular season

Playoffs

References

External links

1921 births
2009 deaths
American men's basketball players
Basketball players from New York City
Baltimore Bullets (1944–1954) players
Centers (basketball)
Cleveland Rebels players
Jewish men's basketball players
LIU Brooklyn Blackbirds men's basketball players
New York Knicks players
Paterson Crescents players
Philadelphia Sphas players
Sportspeople from the Bronx
St. Louis Bombers (NBA) players
Washington Capitols draft picks
Washington Capitols players
20th-century American Jews
21st-century American Jews